Gabriela Mihalcea (née Margineanu; born 27 January 1964) is a Romanian former track and field athlete who competed in the high jump and pole vault. She was two-time national champion in high jump and a six-time pole vault champion.

Mihalcea was the foremost Romanian woman vaulter following the event's introduction to the standard programme and won the bronze medal at the first major international championship: the 1996 European Athletics Indoor Championships. She appeared in the first world level competition (the 1997 IAAF World Indoor Championships) and was fourth in the event's debut at the 1998 European Athletics Championships.

Career
Mihalcea began her career in the high jump and reached the peak of the national scene with victories at the Romanian Athletics Championships in 1983 and 1985, competing against Niculina Vasile and Alina Astafei. Her high jumping career ceased in 1987 after she was banned for two years by the International Amateur Athletics Federation for testing positive for banned steroids.

Following her return from her doping ban, she changed her focus to the pole vault, which was becoming an increasingly popular women's event (thought not yet part of international programmes). She led the way for Romanian women, taking the first three national titles that were available in the sport between 1991 and 1993. She ranked just outside the world's top ten during this period. She cleared four metres for the first time in 1995, doing so both indoors and outdoors. However, she lost her national streak to Gianina Rusu that same year.

The 1996 European Athletics Indoor Championships represented the first occasion that a high level international championship had hosted the women's pole vault event.

The women's pole vault gradually began to be incorporated into major competitions and the standard of the athletes improved. Mihalcea neared four metres in qualifying at the 1997 IAAF World Indoor Championships, but did not make the first ever women's final at the championship. Mihalcea improved her best to  that season. The 1998 season saw her become the inaugural champion at the Balkan Indoor Athletics Championships and she also won the 1998 Balkan Athletics Championships title in a championship record of four metres (succeeding the initial champion Tania Koleva of Bulgaria). She returned to the peak of Romanian vaulting in this same period, with national titles in 1998 and 1999.

She achieved her best results in her final year of high level competition in 1999. She was a qualified non-starter at the 1999 IAAF World Indoor Championships, but cleared  indoors in Athens to set a meet record at the Balkan Indoor Championships. Mihalcea then followed this with  outdoors in Dreux, France. Both of these marks were Romanian national records for the event and were also over-35 masters world records. Her masters marks were bettered by Stacy Dragila in 2008, but she remains the Romanian record holder.

Mihalcea had her last marks over four metres in the 2000 season, achieving a best of  that season at the European Cup Super League in Gateshead.

Personal bests
Pole vault outdoor –  (1999)
Pole vault indoor –  (1999)
High jump outdoor –  (1987)

All info from All Athletics

National titles
Romanian Athletics Championships
High jump: 1983, 1985
Pole vault: 1991, 1992, 1993, 1995, 1998, 1999

International competitions

See also
List of high jump national champions (women)
List of doping cases in athletics

References

External links

Living people
1964 births
Romanian female high jumpers
Romanian female pole vaulters
Romanian sportspeople in doping cases
Doping cases in athletics